The 16th New York Cavalry Regiment was a cavalry regiment that served in the Union Army during the American Civil War. A detachment of the 16th New York had the distinction of killing Lincoln assassin John Wilkes Booth and apprehending accomplice David Herold.

Service
The regiment was organized in Plattsburgh, New York, and mustered into service from June 19 to September 15, 1863. Consisting of eleven companies of cavalry, Companies A, B, C, and D of the 16th New York took part in the Gettysburg Campaign. The regiment was then dispatched to the defense of Washington D.C. and assigned to the Cavalry Brigade of the XXII Corps of the Department of Washington.

Until the end of the Civil War, the 16th New York was repeatedly in action in Northern Virginia and fought a number of engagements against Confederate cavalry commanded by John Singleton Mosby. On August 8, 1864, Capt. James H. Fleming of Company M was killed in action near Fairfax, Virginia. Fleming was the only officer of the 16th New York Cavalry to die in the Civil War.

Before dawn on April 26, 1865, a detachment of the 16th New York Cavalry under the command of Lt. Edward P. Doherty cornered Lincoln assassins Booth and Herold in a tobacco barn near Port Royal, Virginia. Herold surrendered but Booth refused and was shot by Sgt. Boston Corbett. Each of the 26 enlisted men of the 16th Cavalry that participated in the capture received $1,658.58 in reward money.

On August 17, 1865, the 16th New York Cavalry was consolidated with the 13th Regiment New York Volunteer Cavalry; the new organization receiving the designation, 3rd Regiment New York Provisional Cavalry.

Mail-in ballot fraud scheme
In the fall of 1864, Orville Wood, a merchant from Clinton County and supporter of Abraham Lincoln in the 1864 presidential election, was tasked to visit hometown troops and "look after the local ticket."  After seeing evidence of mail-in ballot fraud in another regiment and a hospital, Wood gained the trust of Moses Ferry, representative of Democratic Governor Horatio Seymour in Baltimore, and set out to expose the fraud. At Ferry's direction, Wood forged signatures of the 16th New York Cavalry while a clerk sat across from him signing ballots with names from a roster Wood brought from home. Wood reported this and other such operations he discovered to authorities, and less than two weeks before the election on October 27, 1864, Ferry and another political operative named Edward Donahue Jr. were tried before a military commission. Ferry confessed and offered up names of other conspirators, while Donahue continued to trial and was convicted, partly on Wood's testimony. Both were sentenced to life in prison, with Lincoln's approval.

Total strength and casualties
The regiment suffered 1 officer and 20 enlisted men who were killed in action or mortally wounded and 119 enlisted men who died of disease, for a total of 140 fatalities.

Commanders
 Colonel Henry M. Lazelle
 Colonel Nelson Bowman Sweitzer

See also
List of New York Civil War regiments

Notes

References
The Civil War Archive
New York State Military Museum and Veterans Research Center - Civil War – 16th Cavalry Regiment
Regimental history from The Union Army

External links

Cavalry 016
1863 establishments in New York (state)
Military units and formations established in 1863
Military units and formations disestablished in 1865